Quay of Grenelle (French: Quai de Grenelle) is a 1950 French crime drama film directed by Emil-Edwin Reinert and starring Henri Vidal, Maria Mauban and Françoise Arnoul. It was shot at the Billancourt Studios in Paris. The film's sets were designed by the art director Lucien Aguettand. The film takes its title from a Paris street of the same name.

Synopsis
A young man is wrongly accused of taking part in a robbery and is hunted by the police across Paris.

Cast
 Henri Vidal as Jean-Louis Lavalade
 Maria Mauban as 	Mado
 Françoise Arnoul as 	Simone Lamy
 Micheline Francey as Janine Crioux
 Margo Lion as Madame Chotard
 Robert Dalban as 	L'inspecteur Corbès
 Jean Hébey as 	Monsieur Chotard
 Gabrielle Fontan as 	La vieille dame
 Eliane Saint-Jean as Gisèle Pourqueux 
 Michel Salina as Le commissaire 
 Pierre Asso as 	Le vieux du village
 Hennery as Lorillon - le préposé du commissaire
 Georges Paulais as 	Le chef de rayon de l'Uniprix 
 Émile Genevois as Le vendeur de journaux
 Paul Faivre as Le receveur
 Louis de Funès as Monsieur Vincent - le quincailler
 Gilberte Géniat as 	La caissière 
 René Hell as 	L'hôtelier 
 Liliane Lesaffre as 	L'habilleuse

References

Bibliography
 Goble, Alan. The Complete Index to Literary Sources in Film. Walter de Gruyter, 1999.

External links 
 

1950 films
French crime films
1950s French-language films
1950 crime films
Films directed by Emil-Edwin Reinert
Films based on French novels
Films shot at Billancourt Studios
Films set in Paris
Films shot in Paris
Films based on works by Jacques Laurent
1950s French films